Fetv may refer to:

 fetv, abbreviation for Family Entertainment Television, an American broadcast television network owned by Family Broadcasting Corporation.
 FETV (Panama), a Panamanian television network located in Panama City
 Fe-TV a Texas Spanish-language broadcast television network providing Christian programming to the Hispanic communities